Austin Lightning was an American soccer team, founded in 2002, originally with the name Lafayette Lightning. The team was a member of the United Soccer Leagues Premier Development League (PDL), the fourth tier of the American Soccer Pyramid, until 2007, when the team left the league and the franchise was terminated.

The team played its home games at the Tony Burger Center in the city of Austin, Texas. The team's colors were white and red.

Year-by-year

Coaches
 Chris Veselka 2001
  Jaime Mimbela 2007

Stadia
 Stadium at St. Stephen's Episcopal School, Austin, Texas 2003
 Stadium at Red Rock High School, Red Rock, Texas 2004
 Williamson County Regional Park, Leander, Texas 2003, 2005–06
 Noack Sports Complex, Austin, Texas 2005 (3 games)
 House Park, Austin, Texas 2005 (1 game)
 Tony Burger Center, Austin, Texas 2007

Average attendance
 2007: 282
 2006: 261
 2005: 197

See also
Austin Aztex
Austin Aztex U23

External links
 Austin Lightning
 USL Premier Development League Austin Lightning Page

Association football clubs established in 2002
Association football clubs disestablished in 2007
Sports in Austin, Texas
Soccer clubs in Texas
Defunct Premier Development League teams
2002 establishments in Louisiana
2007 disestablishments in Texas
Lightning